Nikolai or Nikolay is an East Slavic variant of the masculine name Nicholas. It may refer to:

People

Royalty
 Nicholas I of Russia (1796–1855), or Nikolay I, Emperor of Russia from 1825 until 1855
 Nicholas II of Russia (1868–1918), or Nikolay II, last Emperor of Russia, from 1894 until 1917
 Prince Nikolai of Denmark (born 1999)

Other people

Nikolai
 Nikolai Aleksandrovich (disambiguation) or Nikolay Aleksandrovich, several people
 Nikolai Antropov (born 1980), Kazakh former ice hockey winger
 Nikolai Berdyaev (1874-1948), Russian religious and political philosopher
 Nikolai Bogomolov (born 1991), Russian professional ice hockey defenceman
 Nikolai Bukharin (1888–1938), Bolshevik revolutionary and Soviet politician
 Nikolai Bulganin (1895-1975), Soviet politician and minister of defence
 Nikolai Chernykh (1931-2004), Russian astronomer
 Nikolai Dudorov (1906–1977), Soviet politician
 Nikolai Dzhumagaliev (born 1952), Soviet serial killer
 Nikolai Goc (born 1986), German ice hockey player
 Nikolai Gogol (1809-1852), Russian dramatist and novelist
 Nikolai Fraiture (born 1978) American bassist for The Strokes
 Nikolai Khabibulin (born 1973), Russian former ice hockey goaltender
 Nikolai Kinski (born 1976), film actor
 Nikolai Kotlyar (1935–2003), Soviet engineer, maritime specialist and politician
 Nikolai Kulemin (born 1986), Russian ice hockey winger
 Nikolai Lobachevsky (1792-1856), Russian mathematician and geometer
 Nikolai Lukashenko (born 2004), third son of Alexander Lukashenko, the president of Belarus
 Nikolai Medtner (1880-1951), Russian composer and pianist
 Nikolai Melnikov (born 1948), Soviet Olympic champion water polo player
 Nikolai Myaskovsky (1881-1950), Russian composer
 Nikolai Novosjolov (born 1980), Estonian fencer
 Nikolai Onoprienko (1911-1979), Soviet Red Army colonel 
 Nikolai Pegov (1905–1991), Soviet official and diplomat
 Nikolai Pozdneev (1930-1978), Russian painter
 Nikolai Przhevalsky (1839-1888), Russian geographer and explorer
 Nikolai Rimsky-Korsakov (1844-1908), Russian composer
 Nikolai Rubinstein (1835-1881), Russian painter, conductor and composer
 Nikolai Ryzhkov (born 1929), Russian politician
 Nikolai Shchelokov (1910–1984), Soviet statesman and army general
 Nikolay Shubin (born 1956), Georgian-born Russian serial killer
 Nikolai Slichenko (1934–2021),  Soviet and Russian singer, actor, and theatre director
 Nikolai Tanayev (1945–2020), Kyrgyz politician
 Nikolai Tcherepnin (1873-1945), Russian composer, pianist, and conductor
 Nikolai Tikhonov (writer) (1896-1979), Soviet writer
 Nikolai Tikhonov (1905-1997), Russian politician
 Nikolai Timkov (1912-1993), Russian painter
 Nikolai Topor-Stanley (born 1985), Australian footballer
 Nikolai Valuev (born 1973), Russian boxer and world heavyweight champion
 Nikolai Vavilov (1887-1943), Russian botanist and geneticist 
 Nikolai Volkoff (1947–2018), professional WWF wrestler
 Nikolai Yezhov (1895–1940), head of NKVD and perpetrator of the Great Purge
 Nikolai Zherdev (born 1984), Russian ice hockey player

Nikolay
 Nikolay Davydenko (born 1981), professional tennis player
 Nikolay Epshtein (1919–2005), Soviet ice hockey coach
 Nikolay Pechalov (born 1970), Olympic and World champion in weightlifting
 Nikolay Peskov (born 1990), Russian army veteran
 Nikolay Dollezhal (1899-2000), Soviet nuclear reactor designer, head of NIKIET from 1952-1986

Other uses
 Nikolai, Alaska, a city in the United States
 Nikolai Airport, an airport serving Nikolai, Alaska
 Nikolai (vodka), a brand of vodka

See also 
 , includes many people with first given name Nikolai
 , includes many people with first given name Nikolay
 Kolja (disambiguation)
 Kolya (disambiguation)
 Nikola (disambiguation)
 Nicola (disambiguation)
 Nicolai (disambiguation)
 Nikolayev (surname)